Thunder Gulch (May 23, 1992 – March 19, 2018)  was a Champion American Thoroughbred racehorse best known for his wins in the Kentucky Derby and the Belmont Stakes in 1995, which earned him the title of U.S. Champion 3-Yr-Old Colt.

Background
Bred by Peter Brant and owned by Michael Tabor, Thunder Gulch was a son of Gulch out of Line Of Thunder.

Racing career
Thunder Gulch won the Remsen Stakes as a two-year-old in 1994. In the spring of 1995, he won the Fountain of Youth Stakes and the Florida Derby.

At Churchill Downs, he left the starting gate at 25-1 odds in 1995 and won the Kentucky Derby in 2:01.2 from post 16. He was ridden by jockey Gary Stevens. D. Wayne Lukas, his trainer, entered three horses for the 121st "Run for the Roses".

Following his win in Louisville, Thunder Gulch finished  third to his stablemate Timber Country in the Preakness Stakes. In the Belmont Stakes, Thunder Gulch was made 3/2 favourite after Timber Country was withdrawn from the race with a fever. He won by two lengths from Star Standard, giving Lukas the first individual Triple Crown, his fifth consecutive win in the series. Thunder Gulch also won in the Travers Stakes, in which he overcame a bad start to record a four and a half length victory over Pyramid Peak. With the Travers Stakes win, he became only the fourth horse to win the Kentucky Derby, Belmont Stakes, and Travers (Twenty Grand, Whirlaway and Shut Out were the others). Other victories in 1995 included the Swaps Stakes, and the Kentucky Cup Classic Handicap.

Thunder Gulch was retired in the fall of his three-year-old campaign after finishing fifth to  American Horse of the Year  Cigar in a "much-anticipated showdown" for the Jockey Club Gold Cup.  After the race, it was discovered that he had fractured his left front cannon bone.

Stud record
In 2012, the chestnut stallion was standing at Ashford Stud, the American branch of the giant Irish breeder Coolmore Stud, near Versailles, Kentucky, for a fee of $10,000 live foal.

Among the many horses Thunder Gulch has sired are the graded stakes race winners Spain, Balance, Point Given, and Circular Quay.  Point Given was 2001 3 year old Horse of the Year after winning the Preakness Stakes and Belmont Stakes that year.  Circular Quay was among trainer Todd Pletcher's many Kentucky Derby entries of 2007, but ran a disappointing sixth in that race and  fifth in the Preakness. He also sired Alittlebitearly, whose December birth date made it impossible for her to be raced, but has had a successful breeding career, as she was dam to Bayern, a Breeders' Cup Classic winner.  4-time winning bay gelding Sir Mowgli XVII, is now a leading Hunter competing throughout the Southwest, having recently relocated to Durango Farms in Coto de Caza, CA.

In 2015, Thunder Gulch was pensioned from stud duties at Ashford Stud and lived out the rest of his days at the farm. He was selected as the "babysitter of sorts" to be a neighboring pasture companion and calming influence to the newly retired Triple Crown champion, American Pharoah.

Thunder Gulch was euthanized on March 19, 2018, due to the infirmities of old age at Coolmore America's Ashford Stud. Technically age 25, based upon standardized rules declaring all Thoroughbreds a year older each January 1, he was officially age 26.

Pedigree

References

1992 racehorse births
2018 racehorse deaths
Racehorses bred in Kentucky
Racehorses trained in the United States
Kentucky Derby winners
Belmont Stakes winners
Eclipse Award winners
United States Champion Thoroughbred Sires
Thoroughbred family 11-d